Oreilla is a commune in the Pyrénées-Orientales department in southern France.

Geography 
Oreilla is located in the canton of Les Pyrénées catalanes and in the arrondissement of Prades.

History 

Oreilla is the commune of France which suffered the highest ratio of losses during the First World War: 20 men were drafted, 18 were killed in action, which represented 13% of the whole population of the village (the national average was 3.53%)

Population

See also
Communes of the Pyrénées-Orientales department

References

Communes of Pyrénées-Orientales